Fortiche Production SAS is a French  animation studio headquartered in Paris. Its biggest project to date is the television series Arcane.

Development 
Fortiche was founded in 2009 and initially created commercials for Coca-Cola, Honda, Samsung, Panasonic and MTV. From the start, a combination of 2D and 3D animation has defined the studio's style, the "Touche Fortiche".

They moved on to creating music videos, created for Freak Kitchen, Gorillaz and LIMOUSINE. These projects caught the attention of video game studios such as Ubisoft, Volition Studios, Carbine Studios and Riot Games. For the latter, Fortiche produced game trailers in the form of short films along with music videos, most notably Pop/Stars.

They eventually moved on to the production of the series Rabbids Invasion, which it co-produced from 2013 to 2019 for Netflix and Nickelodeon in partnership with Ubisoft.

In 2015, the French channel France 2 broadcast the 55-minute historical documentary film Le dernier Gaulois about the Gallic Wars animated by Fortiche. Motion Capture technology was used for this.

At the 2017 industry fair Cartoon Movie in Bordeaux, the studio pitched the feature film project Miss Saturne with a pilot short film.

Arcane
In November 2021, Fortiche, in collaboration with Riot Games, released the series Arcane set in the League of Legends-universe on the streaming platforms Netflix and in China on Tencent Video. It was the world's most-watched series on Netflix for two weeks in November 2021 and was extremely well received by critics.

During the six year creation of Arcane, staff numbers grew from around 15 to around 300. The studio expanded in 2020 with branches in Montpellier and Las Palmas. The studio's revenue rose to 16.4 million for 2021. Le Figaro reported that the budget of Arcane was 60–80 million. In November 2021 Riot-Games-CEO Nicolo Laurent announced via Twitter that a second season has been commissioned from Fortiche.

On March 14, 2022, Riot Games announced a new equity investment in Fortiche Production. Under the terms of the investment, which closed earlier this year, Riot now holds a significant non-controlling stake in Fortiche. Brian Wright (Chief Content Officer at Riot) and Brendan Mulligan (Director of Corporate Development at Riot) have also joined Fortiche's board of directors.

References

External links
 
 Arcane: Bridging the Rift | League of Legends - Five part "behind the scenes" video series documenting Fortiche's involvement
 Videos in chronological order on the Website of Catsuka (Cartoon-news) 

French animation studios
Companies based in Paris
French companies established in 2009